Vinayapoorvam Vidyaadharan (Malayalam:വിനയപൂർവ്വം വിദ്യാധരൻ) is a 2000 Indian Malayalam film, directed by K. B. Madhu and produced by P. G. Mohan with executive producer Mohamed Siraj.The film stars Jagathy Sreekumar, Sukanya, Harisree Ashokan, Rajan P. Dev, Salu Kuttanad, Jagadeesh, Sukumari, Indrans and N. F. Varghese in lead roles. The film had musical score by Kaithapram.

Cast
 
Jagathy Sreekumar as Vidhyadharan Nair
Sukanya as Shalini Nair
Harisree Ashokan as Punyalan
Sukumari as Vidhyadharan's mother
Rajan P. Dev as Hitler
Salu Kuttanad as Punyalan's right hand
Aloor Elsy
Indrans as Peon Kuttappan
Jagadish as Alex Paul
Kalabhavan Rahman as security guard
Kochu Preman as Captain
Kozhikode Narayanan Nair as Appukuttan Nair
N. F. Varghese as M.S. Nair, Shalini's father
Ponnamma Babu as Vasantha, Shalini's mother
Salim Kumar as Astrologer
Mela Reghu as Hitler's assistant
Kozhikode Sharada as Kalliyankattu Neeli
Spadikam George as Mathai Panadan
Valsala Menon as Wife of the Captain
Easwaran Nair as Nambuthiri
 Jaganadha Kuruppu as Nambiar
Madhupal as Ashique
Nandakishore as Ittooppu
Irshad as Sales Marketing Executive
Manju Pillai as Rexy (Alex's wife)

Soundtrack
The music was composed by Kaithapram.

References

External links
 

2000 films
2000s Malayalam-language films
Films scored by Kaithapram Damodaran Namboothiri